Aravane Rezaï was the defending champion, having won the event in 2012, but she chose not to defend her title.

Timea Bacsinszky won the tournament, defeating Beatriz García Vidagany in the final, 6–1, 6–1.

Seeds

Main draw

Finals

Top half

Bottom half

References 
 Main draw

Open 88 Contrexeville - Singles